Juan Sebastián Villate Lemos (born February 14, 1991) is a Colombian football goalkeeper.

Club career
Villate is a product of the Millonarios youth system and played with the Millonarios first team since July, 2010.

References

External links
golgolgol.net profile

1991 births
Living people
Footballers from Medellín
Association football goalkeepers
Colombian footballers
Colombia under-20 international footballers
Millonarios F.C. players
Real Cartagena footballers